During the 1961–62 Italian football season, Udinese Calcio competed in the Serie A.

Squad

Goalkeepers
  Gianni Romano
  Franco Dinelli
  Dino Zoff

Defenders
  Guglielmo Burelli
  Renato Valenti
  Remo Barbiani
  Claudio Pribaz
  Flavio Colaotto
  Silvio Bernard

Midfielders
  Vasco Tagliavini
  Armando Segato
  Candido Beretta
  Renzo Sassi
  Giuseppe Del Zotto
  Claudio Del Pin
  Franco De Cecco
  Elvio Salvori

Attackers
  Francesco Canella
  Luis Pentrelli
  Arne Selmosson
  Roberto Manganotto
  Giulio Bonafin
  Kurt Andersson
  Carlo Galli
  Leif Mortensen
  Giorgio Tinazzi

Serie A

League table 

Udinese Calcio seasons
Udinese